Speedway Historic District is a national historic district located in the town of Speedway, Indianapolis, Indiana, USA  It encompasses 304 contributing buildings in a planned residential subdivision of Indianapolis. The district developed between about 1912 and 1955 and includes representative examples of American Foursquare and Bungalow / American Craftsman style architecture.

It was listed on the National Register of Historic Places in 2005.

References

Historic districts on the National Register of Historic Places in Indiana
Bungalow architecture in Indiana
Historic districts in Indianapolis
National Register of Historic Places in Indianapolis